Asset Acceptance is a debt buyer. Its primary business is the purchasing of defaulted debts from lenders and subsequent collection of those debts through normal debt collection activities.  The corporation is headquartered in Michigan.

Asset Acceptance is a trade name used by several companies owned by the parent corporation Asset Acceptance Capital Corporation (AACC). It existed since the formation of the predecessor company in 1962.

Asset Acceptance Capital Corporation's main revenue-generating subsidiary is Asset Acceptance, LLC.  Asset Acceptance Capital Corporation, previously a publicly traded company, was one of the largest debt buyers in the United States. The company quadrupled its revenue to $252.7 million from 2001 to 2005.

History
Asset Acceptance Capital Corp. was a publicly traded company.

By 2005 the company's profits rose to $51.3 million. 

By 2009, Asset Acceptance Capital Corp was one of the "four largest publicly traded debt buyers"  who purchased $19.6 billion in distressed debt along with Encore Capital Group, Asta Funding Inc., and Portfolio Recovery Associates. These four companies were behind the explosion of lawsuits against consumers. According to Association of Credit and Collection Professionals these four debt buyers "typically recover three times what they spend buying debt."

Asset Acceptance reported net income of $4.2 million in the third quarter of 2010 under the tenure of Rion Needs, President and CEO and Reid Simpson, Senior Vice President and CFO.

In March 2013, debt collector Encore Capital Group agreed a deal to buy Asset Acceptance for $200 million.

Controversy

Time-barred unpaid debt cannot be collected by a debt collector because of the statute of limitations that limits the number of years in which a debt can be collected. After that time limit has passed, unpaid debts are considered "time-barred" and "debt collectors cannot sue you for not paying a debt that's time-barred". In spite of the law prohibiting "debt buyers" from suing or threatening to sue to collect a debt that is older than the applicable statute of limitations, Asset Acceptance and other debt collectors regularly sued consumers on time-barred debt.

According to an article by Pulitzer prize-winning journalist, Liz Pulliam Weston in The Wall Street Journal, by 2010, the "flood of lawsuits" brought by Asset Acceptance, Encore Capital, Asta and Portfolio Recovery against consumers, drowned civil courts. Weston reported that "over 90% of all debt buyer lawsuits were "won" because the defendant did not respond.

Per a press release of January 30, 2012, the Federal Trade Commission (FTC), the United States' consumer protection agency, accepted a settlement against debt buyer Asset Acceptance that included a $2.5 million penalty over several charges including Asset Acceptance's practices regarding time-barred debt.

References

External links

Financial services companies established in 1962
Financial services companies of the United States
Companies based in Macomb County, Michigan
Companies formerly listed on the Nasdaq
1962 establishments in Michigan
Debt buyers
Debt collection
American companies established in 1962